Davallia divaricata is a fern in the genus Davallia of the family Davalliaceae.

It is native to tropical Southeast Asia.

References

 Ferns and fern allies of Guatemala, 1923

Davalliaceae
Flora of tropical Asia
Medicinal plants of Asia
Plants described in 1828